The Semois (Simwès in Walloon, often under elided form Smwès; Semoy, Sesbach in German, Setzbaach in Luxemburgish of Arlon; and known as the Semoy in France) is a river flowing from the Ardennes uplands of Belgium and France towards the Meuse, of which it is a right tributary.

The source of the Semois is in Arlon, Wallonia, in the Belgian province of Luxembourg, close to the border with the Grand Duchy of Luxembourg.
Belgian–French border. It joins the Meuse  further downstream in Monthermé.

Other places on the banks of the Semois are Chiny, Florenville, Herbeumont, Bouillon (including the localities of Dohan and Poupehan), and Vresse-sur-Semois (all in Belgium).

The earliest documentation of the name, as  SESMARA, is dated from the 2nd century AD. That was before that region was influenced by significant Germanic immigration. Medieval forms include Sesomirs (664), Sesmarus (950), Sesmoys (1104), and Semoir (1244).

The river has given its name to a variety of tobacco grown in the area.

References

International rivers of Europe
Rivers of the Ardennes (Belgium)
Rivers of the Ardennes (France)
Rivers of Belgium
Rivers of France
Rivers of Wallonia
Rivers of Grand Est
Rivers of Ardennes (department)
Rivers of Luxembourg (Belgium)
Rivers of Namur (province)
Arlon
Bertrix
Bouillon
Étalle, Belgium
Florenville
Herbeumont
Tintigny
Belgium–France border
Border rivers